The Indian Arts and Crafts Board (IACB) is an agency within the United States Department of the Interior whose mission is to "promote the economic development of American Indians and Alaska Natives through the expansion of the Indian arts and crafts market." It was established by Congress in 1935. It is headquartered at the Main Interior Building in Washington, DC.

Scope 

The board provides advice and promotional activities and oversees the implementation of the Indian Arts and Crafts Act of 1990, a truth-in-advertising law attempting to stop non-Native-made artworks from being sold as Native-made.

The IACB also operates three museums: 
 Sioux Indian Museum, housed in the Journey Museum in Rapid City, South Dakota
 Museum of the Plains Indian in Browning, Montana
 Southern Plains Indian Museum in Anadarko, Oklahoma. 

The IACB also publishes informative consumer education publications which are available for free download via its website. These publications include: Indian Arts and Crafts Act, How to Buy Authentic Navajo (Diné) Weavings, and Alaska Native Ivory, among many others.

Source Directory 
As part of its program to promote American Indian and Alaska Native art and craftwork, the Indian Arts and Crafts Board produces the "Source Directory of American Indian and Alaska Native Owned and Operated Arts and Crafts Businesses," which lists approximately 400 artists and businesses. These businesses include American Indian or Alaska Native arts and crafts enterprises; businesses and galleries privately owned and operated by individuals, designers, craftspeople, and artists who are enrolled members of federally recognized tribes; and a few nonprofit organizations that develop and market art and craft products and that are managed by enrolled members of federally recognized tribes. Some of the businesses listed in the Source Directory maintain retail shops or open studios. Others sell by appointment or mail order only. This information is provided in the listing, along with business hours, contact information, major products, and special services offered. Businesses are listed alphabetically by state.

References

External links
 

Native American arts organizations
1935 establishments in Washington, D.C.
United States Department of the Interior agencies
Government agencies established in 1935